Nyanzachoerus is an extinct genus of the pig family (Suidae) belonging to the subfamily Tetraconodontinae.  The several species of Nyanzachoerus lived in Africa from the Miocene to Pliocene.

Description

This was a large pig-like creature, larger than living species.

Fossils of males of these species show that they had large lumps on their muzzle and widely flaring cheekbones. Their tusks were only of moderate size. It can be assumed that the ornaments were used as a mating display.

Species
A total of 11 species have been described.

N. syrticus, Leonardi 1952
N. kanamensis, Leakey 1958
N. devauxi, Arambourg 1968
N. jaegeri, Coppens 1971
N. waylandi, Cooke and Coryndon 1970
N. pattersoni, Cooke and Ewer 1972
N. tulotos, Cooke and Ewer 1972
N. plicatus, Cooke and Ewer 1972
N. australis, Cooke and Hendey 1992
N. khinzir, Boisserie, Souron, Mackaye, Likius, Vignaud and Brunet, 2014
N. nakaliensis, Tsubamoto et al., 2020

References

Prehistoric Suidae
Miocene even-toed ungulates
Miocene mammals of Africa
Pliocene even-toed ungulates
Fossil taxa described in 1958
Miocene genus first appearances
Pliocene extinctions
Prehistoric even-toed ungulate genera